Vladimir Vysotsky (1938–1980) was a Russian singer-songwriter, poet and actor who had an immense and enduring effect on Soviet culture.

Vysotsky (masculine), Vysotskaya (feminine), or Vysotskoye (neuter) and variants such as Vysotskiy, Wissotzky or Vyssotsky may refer to:

Places
Vysotsky (inhabited locality) (Vysotskaya, Vysotskoye), several rural localities in Russia
Vysotsk municipal formation in Vyborgsky District of Leningrad Oblast, Russia
Vysotsky Island, Russian-Finnish territory in Baltic Sea a/k/a Maly Vysotsky Island 
Vysotsky Monastery, Russian Orthodox iconic venue in Serpukhov
Vysotskiy Peak in Antarctica

Other
Vysotsky (surname), including variants
Vysotsky (skyscraper) in Yekaterinburg, Russia, named after Vladimir Vysotsky
2374 Vladvysotskij, main belt asteroid named after Vladimir Vysotsky
1600 Vyssotsky, main belt asteroid

See also
Wysocki (surname)